Stilifer is a genus of small ectoparasitic sea snails that used to belong in the family Stiliferidae. Most recent sources consider it part of the family Eulimidae, which also belongs to the superfamily Eulimoidea.

Description
"The imperforate, hyaline, thin shell has ab ovoid or elongated shape. It is smooth and polished. It contains numerous whorl. The apex is very sharp, sometimes bent. The nucleus is sinistral. The body whorl is globular. The aperture is suboval. The inner lip  is smooth and arcuated. The outer lip is slightly sinuous, thin, and simple. There is no operculum.

The body of the animal is ciliated. The tentacles are slender, subulate, with eyes sessile at their outer bases. The mantle is  reflected upon and more or less surrounding the shell, forming a siphonal lobe on the right side. The foot is linguiform, narrow and tubular in front, where it extends much beyond the head, attenuated behind, with a median groove below. The verge is sharp, elongated, resembling a tentacle.

This genus is commensal or parasitic in its habits, occurring on Echinoderms."

Species
The World Register of Marine Species (WoRMS) includes the following species with accepted names in the genus Stilifer:
 Stilifer akahitode, Habe & Masuda, 1990
 Stilifer astericola, Broderip, 1832
 Stilifer barroni, A. Adams, 1854
 Stilifer birtsi, Preston, 1904
 Stilifer celebensis, Kükenthal, 1897
 Stilifer concavus, Warén, 1980
 Stilifer guentheri, Angas, 1877
 Stilifer inflatus, Warén, 1980
 Stilifer kawamurai, Habe, 1976
 Stilifer linckiae, P. Sarasin & F. Sarasin, 1887
 Stilifer ovoideus, H. Adams & A. Adams, 1853
 Stilifer pisum, Habe, 1953
 Stilifer quadrasi, O. Boettger, 1893
 Stilifer utinomi, Habe, 1951
 Stilifer variabilis, O. Boettger, 1893
Species brought into synonymy
 Stilifer abyssorum Locard, 1897: synonym of Pisolamia brychia (Watson, 1883)
 Stilifer acicula Gould, 1849: synonym of Melanella acicula (Gould, 1849)
 Stilifer attenuata Sowerby, 1878: synonym of Scalenostoma subulatum (Broderip, 1832)
 Stilifer auricula Hedley, 1907: synonym of Microstilifer auricula (Hedley, 1907)
 Stilifer brychius Watson, 1883: synonym of Pisolamia brychia (Watson, 1883)
 Stilifer bulbiformis Sowerby, 1878: synonym of Scalenostoma subulatum (Broderip, 1832)
 Stilifer crotaphis Watson, 1886: synonym of Scalenostoma lodderae (Petterd, 1884)
 Stilifer curtus (A. E. Verrill, 1882): synonym of Pelseneeria stimpsonii (A. E. Verrill, 1872)
 Stilifer deformis Pease, 1867: synonym of Scalenostoma subulatum (Broderip, 1832)
 Stilifer exarata A. Adams, 1855: synonym of Scalenostoma subulatum (Broderip, 1832)
 Stilifer fastigiata Sowerby, 1878: synonym of Scalenostoma subulatum (Broderip, 1832)
 Stilifer kochianus G. B. Sowerby III, 1901: synonym of Stilifer variabilis O. Boettger, 1893
 Stilifer lodderae Petterd, 1884: synonym of Scalenostoma lodderae (Petterd, 1884)
 Stilifer minima Dall, 1927: synonym of Ophieulima minima (Dall, 1927)
 Stilifer minimus Dall, 1927: synonym of Ophieulima minima (Dall, 1927)
 Stilifer minuta Dall, 1927: synonym of Pelseneeria minuta (Dall, 1927)
 Stilifer mittrei Petit de la Saussaye, 1851: synonym of Echineulima mittrei (Petit de la Saussaye, 1851)
 Stilifer neozelanica Dell, 1956: synonym of Iphitus neozelanicus (Dell, 1956)
 Stilifer ophidiastericola Habe, 1951: synonym of Stilifer utinomi Habe, 1951
 Stilifer orbiculatus Hedley, 1907: synonym of Fossarella orbiculatus (Hedley, 1907)
 Stilifer palucciae P. Fischer, 1864: synonym of Echineulima palucciae Small text(P. Fischer, 1864)
 Stilifer parva Schepman, 1909: synonym of Stilapex parva (Schepman, 1909)
 Stilifer perdepressus Dall, 1925: synonym of Pelseneeria perdepressa (Dall, 1925)
 Stilifer petterdi Tate & May, 1901: synonym of Scalenostoma lodderae (Petterd, 1884)
 Stilifer polaris Hedley, 1916: synonym of Stilapex polaris (Hedley, 1916)
 Stilifer pyramidalis Reeve, 1859: synonym of Scalenostoma subulatum (Broderip, 1832)
 Stilifer robusta Petterd, 1884: synonym of Scalenostoma lodderae (Petterd, 1884)
 Stilifer sibogae Schepman & Nierstrasz, 1909: synonym of Pelseneeria sibogae (Schepman & Nierstrasz, 1909)
 Stilifer solida Sowerby, 1878: synonym of Scalenostoma subulatum (Broderip, 1832)
 Stilifer speciosus H. Adams, 1869: synonym of Scalenostoma subulatum (Broderip, 1832)
 Stilifer sphaeroconcha Habe, 1974: synonym of Tropiometricola sphaeroconcha (Habe, 1974)
 Stilifer subangulatus A. Adams, 1855: synonym of Scalenostoma subulatum (Broderip, 1832)
 Stilifer subulatus Broderip, 1832: synonym of Scalenostoma subulatum (Broderip, 1832)
 Stilifer thielei Sturany, 1903: synonym of Stilapex thielei (Sturany, 1903)
 Stilifer thomasiae Sowerby, 1878: synonym of Scalenostoma subulatum (Broderip, 1832)
 Stilifer variciferus Hedley, 1899: synonym of Scalenostoma subulatum (Broderip, 1832)
 Stilifer verrilli Dall, 1927: synonym of Pelseneeria stimpsonii (A. E. Verrill, 1872)

References

 Broderip, 1832 (in Broderip & Sowerby) Proceedings of the Committee of Science and Correspondence of the Zoological Society of London, 2: 60.

Eulimidae